Cornelis Gerritsz Decker (1618, Haarlem – 1678, Haarlem), was a Dutch Golden Age landscape painter.

Life
He was possibly a relation of David Decker, who was registered in the Haarlem guild as a pupil of Gerrit Claesz Bleker in Haarlem in 1640. David Decker's only known artwork was formerly attributed to Cornelis and shows strong similarity with his work.

Cornelis Gerritsz Decker became a member of the Haarlem Guild of St. Luke in 1643.

Work

He painted landscapes in the manner of Jacob van Ruisdael. Some of the staffage in his landscapes was painted by Adriaen van Ostade, Philips Wouwerman and Johannes Lingelbach.

References

Links

Cornelis Gerritsz Decker on Artnet
 

1618 births
1678 deaths
Dutch Golden Age painters
Dutch male painters
Artists from Haarlem
Painters from Haarlem